Azzurro is a 2000 French-Italian-Swiss drama film directed by Denis Rabaglia.

Cast 
 Paolo Villaggio as Giuseppe De Metrio
 Francesca Pipoli as Carla De Metrio
 Marie-Christine Barrault as Elizabeth Broyer
 Jean-Luc Bideau as Gaston Broyer
 Renato Scarpa as Giorgio
 Julien Boisselier as Pascal Broyer
 Antonio Petrocelli as Roberto De Metrio
  as Lucia De Metrio
 Tom Novembre as Philippe

References

External links 

2000 drama films
2000 films
French drama films
Italian drama films
Swiss drama films
2000s French films